Tirthankar Roy (born 14 February 1960) is an Indian economic historian and Professor of Economic History at the London School of Economics. He is one of the most influential researchers of the Economic History of South Asia and India, having published over 25 books and numerous articles. His work spans the fields of Economic History, Business History and Social History, particularly studying the effects of British colonialism in India on its economic development.

Biography

Roy received an M.A. in Economics from Visva-Bharati University in West Bengal, India and subsequently his Ph.D. from the Centre for Development Studies, Thiruvananthapuram, Kerala, India, in 1989. Before joining the LSE, he served as a professor at the Gokhale Institute of Politics and Economics in Pune, India. He is currently a Professor of Economic History at the London School of Economics. He serves on the editorial boards of internationally recognised journals including the Indian Economic and Social History Review and the Springer Economic History series.

Selected publications
 Economic Change in Global History (London, United Kingdom: Bloomsbury Press, TBD)
 A Business History of India: Enterprise and the Emergence of Capitalism from 1700 (Cambridge, United Kingdom: Cambridge University Press, 2018)
 The Economy of South Asia from 1950 to the Present (Cham, Switzerland: Palgrave Macmillan, 2017)
 (With Anand V. Swamy) Law and the Economy in Colonial India (Chicago, United States: University of Chicago Press, 2016)
 An Economic History of Early Modern India (London, United Kingdom: Routledge, 2013)
 East India Company: The World’s Most Powerful Corporation (New Delhi, India: Allen Lane, 2012)
 The Economic History of India 1857-1947 (Delhi, India: Oxford University Press, 2011)
 (With Giorgio Riell)How India Clothed the World: The World of South Asian Textiles 1500-1850 (Leiden, Netherlands: E.J. Brill, 2010)
 (With Douglas Haynes, Abigail McGowan, Haruka Yanagisawa) Towards a History of Consumption in South Asia (Delhi, India: Oxford University Press, 2010)
 Company of Kinsmen: Community and Enterprise in South Asian History 1700-1950 (Delhi, India: Oxford University Press, 2010)
 Rethinking Economic Change in India: Labour and Livelihood (Abingdon, United Kingdom and New York, United States: Routledge, 2005)
 Traditional Industry in the Economy of Colonial India (Cambridge, United Kingdom: Cambridge University Press, 1999)
 Artisans and Industrialization: Indian Weaving in the Twentieth Century, (Delhi, India: Oxford University Press, 1993)
 (With Ashok Desai) Economic Reforms: The Next Step (Delhi, India: Rajiv Gandhi Foundation, 1998)
 Cloth and Commerce: Textiles in Indian History (Delhi, India: SAGE Publications, 1996)
  The Story of Indian Business The East India Company''

References

1960 births
British economists
Economic historians
Living people
Academics of the London School of Economics
Indian economists
Visva-Bharati University alumni
People from Birbhum district